La Rochelle is a suburb of Johannesburg, South Africa. South of the Johannesburg CBD, the suburbs of Turffontein and Rosettenville lie to its south. It is located in Region F of the City of Johannesburg Metropolitan Municipality.

History
Prior to the discovery of gold on the Witwatersrand in 1886, the suburb lay on land on one of the original farms called Turffontein. It became a suburb in 1895, and named after the estate owned by Josias Eduard de Villiers and the French town of La Rochelle.

References

Johannesburg Region F